Taranis circumflexa is an extinct species of sea snail, a marine gastropod mollusk in the family Raphitomidae.

Description

Distribution
This extinct marine species was found in Lower Pliocene strata of Liguria, Italy.

References

 Sosso M., Dell'Angelo B. & Tavano M.L. (2018). I tipi della collezione Hornung depositati nel Museo Civico di Storia Naturale “G. Doria” di Genova (Mollusca, Gastropoda). Annali del Museo Civico di Storia Naturale “G. Doria”. 111: 325-356

External links
 Hornung, A. (1920). Gastéropodes fossiles du Rio Torsero (Cériale). Pliocène inférieur de la Ligurie. Annali del Museo Civico di Storia Naturale Giacomo Doria. 49 [ser. 3, 9]: 70-92, pl. 2 

circumflexa
Gastropods described in 1920